The Trimaran Yacht Club of Victoria was a club in Victoria, Australia, for persons interested in trimaran sailboats.

Newsletters
The club published the T.Y.C.V Newsletter every two months. The first newsletter was published on 31 March 1970 with a list price of 5c. The final newsletter was published on 11 August 1977 wish a list price of 5c.

Fate
In 1977 the club became the Multihull Yacht Club of Victoria. 

In the final edition of the newsletter, the commodore David Drew wrote of this decision:

References

Yacht clubs in Victoria (Australia)
1977 disestablishments in Australia